Don Carlos, a.k.a. Don McCarlos (born Euvin Spencer, 29 June 1952), is a Jamaican reggae singer and composer.

Biography

Don Carlos began singing in 1973 as a member of Black Uhuru. He sang alongside Garth Dennis and Derrick Simpson, the leader of the trio.

In 1988 he recorded "Jingle Bells" with Glenice Spenser on A Reggae Christmas on RAS Records. In 1990 he re-united as the lead vocalist for a Black Uhuru album. Carlos continues to perform all over the world, and has a large fanbase in Africa.

Africa tours

Carlos performed in Nairobi, Kenya in 2010 and on June 3, 2017. He performed in the Zambian cities Lusaka, Kitwe and Livingstone (Mosi-oa-Tunya) between 6 and 8 June 2014.

Discography

Solo
Suffering (1981), Negus Roots - also released as Prophecy
Day to Day Living (1982), Greensleeves
Harvest Time (1982), Negus Roots
Spread Out (1983), Burning Sounds
Pass the Lazer Beam (1983), Jackpot
Just A Passing Glance (1984), RAS
Deeply Concerned (1987), RAS
Time Is The Master (1992), RAS
7 Days A Week (1998), RAS
Dub Version (2000), Dressed to Kill
Changes (2010), Heartbeat

Don Carlos & Gold
Them Never Know Natty Dread Have Him Credential (1981), Channel One
Raving Tonight (1983), RAS
Ghetto Living (1983), Tamoki Wambesi
Never Run Away (1984), Kingdom
Plantation (1984), CSA
Ease Up (1994), RAS

Split albums
Prison Oval Clash (1980), Tamoki Wambesi - split with Earl Cunningham and Charlie Chaplin
Roots & Culture (1982), Jah Guidance - split with Culture
Show-Down Vol. 3 (1984), Empire/Channel One - Don Carlos & Gold/The Gladiators
Rasta Brothers (1985), Dancefloor - with Anthony Johnson & Little John
Firehouse Clash (1986), Live & Learn - with Junior Reid
Head 2 Head (2001), Attack - Horace Andy & Don Carlos

Guest appearances
Groundation - Hebron Gate (2002), Young Tree 
Groundation - Dragon War (2003), Young Tree
Groundation - We Free Again (2004), Young Tree
Slightly Stoopid - Top of the World - "Marijuana" (2012), Stoopid
Slightly Stoopid - Live at Roberto's Tri Studios 9.13.11 - "Lazer Beam" (2014)
Tribal Seeds - "Blood Clot" - Representing (2014)
Rebelution - "Roots Reggae Music" - Count Me In (2014)
Simple Creation - "?" - Golden Roots (2017)
Slightly Stoopid - "Everyday Life, Everyday People" - Stay the Same (Prayer for You) (2018)
Slightly Stoopid - "Everyday Life, Everyday People" - Talk Too Much (2018)

Compilations
The Mighty Diamonds Meets Don Carlos & Gold at the Channel 1 Studio featuring The Revolutionaries, Hitbound - the Diamonds Right Time and Don Carlos & Gold's Them Never Know Natty Dread Have Him Credential albums combined
Pure Gold, Jackpot
Lazer Beam (1995), Culture Press
Portrait (1997), RAS
Jah Light (2002), Black Arrow
Groove With Me (2003), Get Back
Inna Dub Style - Rare Dubs 1979 - 1980 (2004), Jamaican Recordings
Special Edition (2004), Jafada Music Productions
Tribulation (2006), Attack
Tribulation - Don Carlos In Dub (2007), Attack
Kings of Reggae, Nocturne

DVD
Live in San Francisco (2003), 2B1
Live in Reggae Rising (2019)

References

External links
Official website
Discography at Discogs

1952 births
Living people
Jamaican reggae musicians
Musicians from Kingston, Jamaica
Black Uhuru members
Greensleeves Records artists